The Arizona Complex League Giants are a professional baseball team competing as a Rookie-level affiliate of the San Francisco Giants in the Arizona Complex League of Minor League Baseball. The team plays its home games at Scottsdale Stadium in Scottsdale, Arizona. The team is composed mainly of players who are in their first year of professional baseball either as draftees or non-drafted free agents from the United States, Canada, Dominican Republic, Venezuela, and other countries.

History
The team first competed in the Arizona League from 1991 to 1994, then was absent from the league until 2000. The team has been a member of the league continuously since 2000, fielding two squads in the league since 2018. The two squads are differentiated by Black and Orange suffixes. Prior to the 2021 season, the Arizona League was renamed as the Arizona Complex League (ACL).

The team has played some day games out of their parent club's minor league clubhouse at Indian School Park in Scottsdale.

Rosters

References

External links
 Official website (Black)
 Official website (Orange)

Arizona Complex League teams
Professional baseball teams in Arizona
San Francisco Giants minor league affiliates
1991 establishments in Arizona
Baseball teams established in 1991